Chicken 65 is a spicy, deep-fried chicken dish originating from Hotel Buhari, Chennai, India, as an entrée, or quick snack. The flavour of the dish can be attributed to red chillies, but the exact set of ingredients for the recipe can vary. It is prepared using boneless chicken and is usually served with an onion and lemon garnish. Vegetarian variants like "Paneer 65" or "Gobi 65" use paneer or cauliflower instead. While the name "Chicken 65" is universally used to refer to the dish, there are many different theories claiming its origins.

Origins
Although Chicken 65 is well established as being the invention of A. M. Buhari of the Buhari Hotel chain, its popularity as a dish has spawned several myths about its origin and name. One account claims that the dish emerged as a simple meal for Indian soldiers in 1965. Another account claims that it is a dish containing 65 chili peppers devised by an enterprising hotelier. It is also claimed to relate to a requirement for the meat to be from 65-day-old chickens. Still others claim that it means 65 pieces of chicken.

See also

 List of chicken dishes
 List of deep-fried foods

References

Deep fried foods
Indian chicken dishes